Georgi Iliev may refer to: 

 Georgi Iliev (businessman) (1966–2005), Bulgarian businessman
 Georgi Iliev (footballer, born 1981), Bulgarian footballer
 Georgi Iliev (footballer, born 1956), Bulgarian footballer and manager
 Georgi Iliev (ice hockey) (born 1948), Bulgarian ice hockey player
 Georgi Iliev (gymnast) (born 1996), Bulgarian trampolinist